Qamcheqay (also Romanized as Qamcheqāy and Qamchaqai; also known as Kamchakay, Qamchāy, and Qamchīqāh) is a village in Golabar Rural District, in the Central District of Ijrud County, Zanjan Province, Iran. At the 2006 census, its population was 434, in 115 families.

References 

Populated places in Ijrud County